This article contains information about the literary events and publications of 1979.

Events
May – The Merchant Ivory Productions film The Europeans is released. Its screenplay by Ruth Prawer Jhabvala draws on the 1878 Henry James novel of the same name.
October 25 – The London Review of Books is first issued, its founding editors being Karl Miller, Mary-Kay Wilmers and Susannah Clapp. For its first six months it appears as an insert to The New York Review of Books.
November – Dambudzo Marechera's The House of Hunger wins the Guardian Fiction Prize.
unknown dates
K. W. Jeter's novel Morlock Night pioneers full-length fiction in the genre he later calls steampunk.
August Wilson's Jitney is first produced; it becomes the eighth in his "Pittsburgh Cycle".

New books

Fiction
Douglas Adams – The Hitchhiker's Guide to the Galaxy
V. C. Andrews – Flowers in the Attic
Jeffrey Archer – Kane and Abel
Barbara Taylor Bradford – A Woman of Substance
Octavia Butler – Kindred
Italo Calvino — If on a winter's night a traveler
Orson Scott Card – A Planet Called Treason
Angela Carter – The Bloody Chamber
Eileen Chang – Lust, Caution
Agatha Christie – Miss Marple's Final Cases and Two Other Stories
L. Sprague de Camp and Lin Carter – Conan the Liberator
Michael Ende – The Neverending Story (Die unendliche Geschichte)
José Pablo Feinmann – Últimos días de la víctima
Thomas Flanagan — Year of the French
Alan Dean Foster – Alien (movie novelization)
Carlo Fruttero and Franco Lucentini — A che punto è la notte
Brian Garfield - The Paladin
William Golding – Darkness Visible
William Goldman – Tinsel
Nadine Gordimer – Burger's Daughter
Arthur Hailey – Overload
Stratis Haviaras – When the Tree Sings
Douglas Hill – Galactic Warlord
Stephen King – The Dead Zone
Russell Kirk – The Princess of All Lands
Milan Kundera – The Book of Laughter and Forgetting (first published in French as Le Livre du rire et de l'oubli)
John le Carré – Smiley's People
Morgan Llywelyn – Lion of Ireland: The Legend of Brian Boru
Robert Ludlum – The Matarese Circle
Norman Mailer – The Executioner's Song
Cormac McCarthy - Suttree
Roger McDonald – 1915: a novel
Haruki Murakami – Hear the Wind Sing (風の歌を聴け, Kaze no uta o kike)
Ellis Peters – One Corpse Too Many
Jerry Pournelle – Janissaries
Satyajit Ray – Hatyapuri
Harold Robbins – Memories of Another Day
Philip Roth – The Ghost Writer
Mary Stewart – The Last Enchantment
Peter Straub – Ghost Story
William Styron – Sophie's Choice
Trevanian – Shibumi
Kaari Utrio – Rautalilja
Jack Vance – The Face
Kurt Vonnegut – Jailbird
Elizabeth Walter – In the Mist and Other Uncanny Encounters
William Wharton – Birdy
Kit Williams – Masquerade
Raymond Williams – The Fight for Manod
Robert Anton Wilson – Schrodinger's Cat
Tom Wolfe – The Right Stuff
Roger Zelazny – Roadmarks

Children and young people
Chris Van Allsburg – The Garden of Abdul Gasazi
Katharine Mary Briggs (with Anne Yvonne Gilbert) – Abbey Lubbers, Banshees, & Boggarts: An Illustrated Encyclopedia of Fairies
Raymond Briggs – Fungus the Bogeyman
Roald Dahl – The Twits
Colin Dann – The Animals of Farthing Wood
Peter Dickinson (with Wayne Anderson) – The Flight of Dragons
Elizabeth Laird – Rosy's Garden
Robie Macauley – A Secret History of Time to Come
Bill Peet – Cowardly Clyde
Daniel Pinkwater – Yobgorgle: Mystery Monster of Lake Ontario
Ellen Raskin – The Westing Game
Jane Severance (with Tea Schook) – When Megan Went Away
Barbara Sleigh – Carbonel and Calidor
Angela Sommer-Bodenburg – Der kleine Vampir
Rosemary Wells – Max & Ruby
Robert Munsch – Mud Puddle

Drama
Bahram Beyzai – Death of Yazdgerd (مرگ یزدگرد)
Caryl Churchill – Cloud Nine
David Fennario – Balconville
Richard Harris – Outside Edge
Elfriede Jelinek – Was geschah, nachdem Nora ihren Mann verlassen hatte; oder Stützen der Gesellschaften (What Occurred after Nora Left her Husband, or Supports of Society)
Heiner Müller – Hamletmachine (first performance)
Mark Medoff – Children of a Lesser God
Neil Oram – The Warp 
Peter Shaffer – Amadeus
Sam Shepard – Buried Child
Martin Sherman – Bent
Tom Stoppard – Undiscovered Country

Poetry

Kingsley Amis – Collected Poems

Non-fiction
Alison Adburgham – Shopping in Style: London from the Restoration to Edwardian Elegance
David Attenborough – Life on Earth
Harold Walter Bailey – Dictionary of Khotan Saka
Jerome Bruner – On Knowing: Essays for the Left Hand
L. Sprague de Camp (editor) – The Blade of Conan
Elizabeth Eisenstein – The Printing Press as an Agent of Change
Peter Evans – The Music of Benjamin Britten
John Fowles – The Tree
Sandra Gilbert and Susan Gubar – The Madwoman in the Attic: The Woman Writer and the Nineteenth-Century Literary Imagination
Eloise Greenfield, Lessie Jones Little, Pattie Ridley Jones – Childtimes: A Three-Generation Memoir
Douglas Hofstadter – Gödel, Escher, Bach: An Eternal Golden Braid
Henry Kissinger – The White House Years
Leon Litwack – Been in the Storm So Long: The Aftermath of Slavery
Jean-François Lyotard – The Postmodern Condition: A Report on Knowledge (La Condition postmoderne: rapport sur le savoir)
Jessica Mitford – Poison Penmanship: the Gentle Art of Muckraking
Stephen Pile – The Book of Heroic Failures
Clark Ashton Smith – The Black Book of Clark Ashton Smith
Margaret Trudeau – Beyond Reason
Tom Wolfe – The Right Stuff

Births
February 4 – Ben Lerner, American poet, novelist and critic
February 10 – Johan Harstad, Norwegian novelist
February 27 - Alexander Gordon Smith, British children's and young-adult author
March 28 – Benjamin Percy, American short story writer
April 14 – Patrick Somerville, American novelist and short story writer
May 21 - James Clancy Phelan, American young-adult and thriller writer
June 28 – Florian Zeller, French novelist and dramatist
July 14 – Yukiko Motoya, Japanese fiction writer, playwright, theatre director and voice actress
unknown dates
D.D. Johnston, Scottish political novelist and university lecturer
Emily St. John Mandel, Canadian-born novelist

Deaths
January – Dilys Cadwaladr, Welsh-language poet (born 1902)
January 27 – Victoria Ocampo, Argentine publisher, writer and critic (born 1890)
February 9 – Allen Tate, American poet and essayist (born 1899)
February 25 – John L. Wasserman, American entertainment critic (car accident, born 1938)
February 27 – Sir George Clark, English historian (born 1890)
March 26 – Jean Stafford, American short story writer and novelist (heart failure; born 1915)
April 8 – Breece D'J Pancake, American short story writer (suicide, born 1952)
May 10 – J. B. Morton (Beachcomber), English humorous newspaper columnist (born 1893)
May 14 – Jean Rhys, Dominica-born English novelist (born 1890)
June 1 – Eric Partridge, New Zealand/British lexicographer (born 1894)
June 3 – Arno Schmidt, German novelist (born 1914)
June 7 – Forrest Carter, American genre novelist (heart failure, born 1925)
July 6 – Malcolm Hulke, English television writer (born 1924)
July 7 – Ahmad Qandil, Saudi Arabian poet  (born 1911) 
July 15 – Juana de Ibarbourou, Uruguayan poet (born 1892)
July 21 – Eugène Vinaver, Russian-born English literary scholar (born 1899)
July 23 – Joseph Kessel, French journalist and novelist (born 1898)
July 29 – Herbert Marcuse, German Jewish philosopher (born 1898)
August 8 – Nicholas Monsarrat, English novelist (born 1910)
August 16 – Jerzy Jurandot  (Jerzy Glejgewicht), Polish poet and dramatist (born 1911)
August 20 – Christian Dotremont, Belgian painter and writer (born 1922)
August 22 – James T. Farrell, American novelist (born 1904)
September 5 – John Bradburne, English poet and missionary (killed by guerillas; born 1921)
September 6 – Guy Bolton, British playwright (born 1884)
September 25 – Zhou Libo (周立波), Chinese novelist and translator (born 1908)
October 6 – Elizabeth Bishop, American poet (born 1911)
October 17 – S. J. Perelman, American humorist (born 1904)
October 18 – Virgilio Piñera, Cuban poet and short-story writer (born 1912)
December 12 – Goronwy Rees, Welsh journalist and academic (born 1909)
December 19 – Donald Creighton, Canadian historian (born 1902)

Awards
Nobel Prize for Literature: Odysseus Elytis

Canada
See 1979 Governor General's Awards for a complete list of winners and finalists for those awards.

France
Prix Goncourt: Antonine Maillet, Pélagie la Charette
Prix Médicis French: Claude Durand, La Nuit zoologique 
Prix Médicis International: Alejo Carpentier, La harpe et l'ombre

Spain
Miguel de Cervantes Prize: Jorge Luis Borges and Gerardo Diego

United Kingdom
Booker Prize: Penelope Fitzgerald, Offshore
Carnegie Medal for children's literature: Peter Dickinson, Tulku
Cholmondeley Award:
Guardian Fiction Prize: Neil Jordan, Night in Tunisia and Dambudzo Marechera, The House of Hunger
James Tait Black Memorial Prize for fiction: William Golding, Darkness Visible
James Tait Black Memorial Prize for biography: Brian Finney, Christopher Isherwood: A Critical Biography

United States
American Academy of Arts and Letters Gold Medal for Fiction :
Nebula Award: Vonda N. McIntyre, Dreamsnake
Hugo Award: Vonda N. McIntyre, Dreamsnake
Locus Award for Best Novel: Vonda N. McIntyre, Dreamsnake
Newbery Medal for children's literature:
Bancroft Prize: Christopher Thorne, Allies of a Kind: The United States, Britain, and the War Against Japan, 1941–1945
Bancroft Prize: Anthony F. C. Wallace, Rockdale: The Growth of An American Village in the Early Industrial Revolution
Pulitzer Prize for Drama: Sam Shepard, Buried Child
Pulitzer Prize for Biography or Autobiography: Leonard Baker, Days of Sorrow and Pain: Leo Baeck and the Berlin Jews
Pulitzer Prize for Fiction: John Cheever, The Stories of John Cheever
Pulitzer Prize for Poetry: Robert Penn Warren, Now and Then: Poems 1976–1978
Pulitzer Prize for History: Don E. Fehrenbacher, The Dred Scott Case: Its Significance in American Law and Politics
Pulitzer Prize for General Non-Fiction: E. O. Wilson, On Human Nature

Elsewhere
Miles Franklin Award: David Ireland, A Woman of the Future
Premio Nadal: Carlos Rojas, El ingenioso hidalgo y poeta Federico García Lorca asciende a los infiernos
Viareggio Prize: Giorgio Manganelli, Centuria

References

 
Years of the 20th century in literature